Mayelis Yesenia Caripá Castillo (born 16 August 1980 in Valencia) is a Venezuelan freestyle wrestler. She competed at the 2004, 2008 and 2012 Summer Olympics.  

In 2004, she did not get out of her pool in the 48 kg freestyle event.  
At the 2008 Summer Olympics, she lost to Vanessa Boubryemm in the first round of the 48 kg event.  She competed in the freestyle 48 kg event at the 2012 Summer Olympics; she defeated Alexandra Engelhardt in the 1/8 finals and was eliminated by Irini Merleni in the quarterfinals.

References

External links
 

Venezuelan female sport wrestlers
Olympic wrestlers of Venezuela
Wrestlers at the 2004 Summer Olympics
Wrestlers at the 2008 Summer Olympics
Wrestlers at the 2012 Summer Olympics
Sportspeople from Valencia, Venezuela
1980 births
Living people
Pan American Games medalists in wrestling
Pan American Games bronze medalists for Venezuela
South American Games bronze medalists for Venezuela
South American Games medalists in wrestling
Wrestlers at the 2007 Pan American Games
Competitors at the 2014 South American Games
21st-century Venezuelan women